Jacoby Rhinehart (born February 7, 1977, in Dallas, Texas) is a former professional Canadian football who played for Montreal Alouettes of the Canadian Football League. He was selected in the 6th round (190 overall) by the Arizona Cardinals in the 1999 NFL draft.

References

1977 births
Living people
American players of Canadian football
Arizona Cardinals players
Calgary Stampeders players
Canadian football defensive backs
Montreal Alouettes players
People from Dallas
SMU Mustangs football players